Ingrid Bergman: In Her Own Words is a 2015 Swedish documentary film about Ingrid Bergman directed by Stig Björkman. It was screened in the Cannes Classics section at the 2015 Cannes Film Festival where it received a special mention for L'Œil d'or.

Cast
 Alicia Vikander as Ingrid Bergman (voice, Swedish version)
 Melinda Kinnaman as Ingrid Bergman (voice, English version)
 Jeanine Basinger as herself
 Pia Lindström as herself
 Fiorella Mariani as herself
 Ingrid Rossellini as herself
 Isabella Rossellini as herself
 Roberto Ingmar Rossellini as himself
 Liv Ullmann as herself
 Sigourney Weaver as herself

Release

The film had its world premiere at the Cannes Film Festival on 19 May 2015. The film was selected to screen at the Jerusalem Film Festival on 12 July 2015. The film had its North American premiere at the New York Film Festival. The film was released in Sweden on 28 August 2015. On 27 August 2015, the film was acquired by Rialto Pictures and set the film for a 13 November 2015, limited release, in the United States.

Awards
At the 2015 Vancouver International Film Festival, the film won the award for Most Popular International Documentary, based on audience balloting.

Home media
Ingrid Bergman: In Her Own Words has been released on Blu-ray and DVD by The Criterion Collection.

References

External links
 
 
 
 
Ingrid Bergman: In Her Own Words: A Full Picture of a Life an essay by Jeanine Basinger at the Criterion Collection

2015 films
2015 documentary films
Swedish documentary films
2010s Swedish-language films
Documentary films about women in film
Documentary films about actors
Films directed by Stig Björkman
2010s Swedish films